Laurence Fishburne is an American actor of the stage and screen.

He has received various award nominations including an Academy Award for Best Actor his role of Ike Turner in the film What's Love Got to Do with It (1993). He has also received a Golden Globe Award and a Independent Spirit Award nomination. For his work on television he has earned eleven Primetime Emmy Award nominations winning three times for TriBeCa (1993), Miss Evers' Boys (1997), and #FreeRayshawn (2017). For his work in film and television he has been nominated five times for Screen Actors Guild Awards for The Tuskegee Airmen (1996), Mystic River (2003), Bobby (2006), Thurgood (2011), and Black-ish (2017, 2018). For his work on stage he received two Tony Award nominations winning Best Featured Actor in a Play for August Wilson's Two Trains Running in 1992.

Major associations

Academy Award

Emmy Awards

Golden Globe Awards

Independent Spirit Awards

Screen Actors Guild Awards

Tony Awards

Miscellaneous awards

Saturn Awards

Acapulco Black Film Festival

BET Awards

Black Movie Awards

Black Reel Awards

MTV Movie Awards

NAACP Image Award

San Diego Film Festival

Theatre World Award

References 

Fishburne, Laurence